Ilha de Tinharé (Tinharé Island) is an island located in the municipality of Cairu, on the coast of Brazil.

The town of Tinharé is accessible via catamaran or boat from the river that passes through the municipality of Valença.

Atlantic islands of Brazil